Nakano may refer to:

 Nakano, Tokyo
 Nakano, Nagano
 Nakano (surname)
 Nakano Corporation

See also
 
 Nakano Station (disambiguation)